Auguries of Innocence is a poetry collection by Patti Smith, published in 2005.

Contents 
 "The Lovecrafter"
 "Worthly The Lamb Slain For Us"
 "Sleep Of The Dodo"
 "The Long Road"
 "A Phytagorean Traveler"
 "Desert Chorus"
 "Written By A Lake"
 "The Oracle"
 "The Setting And The Stone"
 "The Mast Is Down"
 "The Blue Doll"
 "Eve Of All Saints"
 "She Lay In The Stream Dreaming Of August Sander"
 "Fourteen"
 "Birds Of Iraq"
 "Marigold"
 "Tara"
 "To His Daughter"
 "The Pride Moves Slowly"
 "The Leaves Are Late Falling"
 "Wilderness"
 "The Geometry Blinked Ruin Unimaginable"
 "Fenomenico"
 "Three Windows"
 "Our Jargon Muffies The Drum
 "Death Of A Tramp"
 "Mummer Love"
 "The Writer's Song"

References

External links 
 
 Auguries of Innocence at Library Journal
 Interview with Patti Smith on the book

American poetry collections
Poetry by Patti Smith
2005 poetry books
Books by Patti Smith